Glenlawn Collegiate is a public English-language secondary school in Winnipeg, Manitoba, Canada, located at 770 St. Mary's Road, Elm Park in the suburb of St. Vital.  It is part of the Louis Riel School Division.

Notable alumni

 Obie Baizley: Progressive Conservative member of the Legislative Assembly of Manitoba, cabinet minister under Dufferin Roblin and Walter Weir.
 Reid Carruthers: World Men's Curling Champion
 Edward Connery: Progressive Conservative member of the Legislative Assembly of Manitoba, cabinet minister under Gary Filmon.
 Gabriel Langois: Known affectionately as "Dancing Gabe" by Winnipeg sports fans.
 Nigel Dawes: Professional hockey player.
 Gerald Ducharme: Progressive Conservative member of the Legislative Assembly of Manitoba, cabinet minister under Gary Filmon.
 Laurie Hawn: Member of Parliament
 Jim Peebles: Won the Nobel Prize in Physics
 Adam Smoluk: Actor, Screenwriter, and Director

References

High schools in Winnipeg
Educational institutions in Canada with year of establishment missing
St. Vital, Winnipeg